Gościcina is a river of Poland, a tributary of the Bolszewka near Wejherowo.

References

2Gościcina
Rivers of Poland
Rivers of Pomeranian Voivodeship